GraphQL is an open-source data query language and data manipulation language for APIs, and a query runtime engine.

History 

Facebook (now Meta) started GraphQL development in 2012 and released it in 2015. GraphQL was moved on 7 November 2018 to the newly established GraphQL Foundation, hosted by the non-profit Linux Foundation.

On 9 February 2018, the GraphQL Schema Definition Language (SDL) became part of the specification.

Design 

GraphQL provides a web API approach in which clients define the structure of the data to be returned by the server. This can impede web caching of query results.
GraphQL does not provide a full-fledged graph query language such as SPARQL, or even in dialects of SQL that support transitive closure.  For example, a GraphQL interface that reports the parents of an individual cannot return, in a single query, the set of all their ancestors.

GraphQL consists of a type system, query language and execution semantics, static validation, and type introspection.
It supports reading, writing (mutating), and subscribing to changes to data (realtime updates – most commonly implemented using Websockets). GraphQL servers are available for multiple languages. The result of a single query is returned in JSON format.

Example 

POST request:

{
    orders {
        id
        productsList {
            product {
                name
                price
            }
            quantity
        }
        totalAmount
    }
}

Response:

{
    "data": {
        "orders": [
            {
                "id": 1,
                "productsList": [
                    {
                        "product": {
                            "name": "orange",
                            "price": 1.5
                        },
                        "quantity": 100
                    }
                ],
                "totalAmount": 150
            }
        ]
    }
}

Testing 

GraphQL APIs can be tested manually or with automated tools issuing GraphQL requests and verifying the correctness of the results. Automatic test generation is also possible. New requests may be produced through search-based techniques.

Software for testing includes Step CI.

See also 

 Query by Example
 OpenAPI Specification
 Microservices

References

External links 

 
 

 
Query languages
Data modeling languages